is a Japanese recitative dance, originating in the 15th century and popular during the Sengoku and early Edo periods (late 16th to early 17th centuries). Although kōwakamai has dance and musical components, scholars consider its textual component as an independent literary genre.

Kōwakamai may have evolved from the dance form called kusemai of the 14th century, sharing its origins in traditional court dance and music with nō and kabuki. Little is actually known about how the dance was performed in the warlord to shogunate periods. A remnant of the kōwakamai is performed every year on January 20 at Tenman-jinja, a shintō shrine in Ōe.

History
Kōwakamai (along with Noh) is a form of entertainment enjoyed by warrior-class families during Japan's medieval age. Kōwakamai performances were celebratory but also the cause for sorrow. Many of the pieces are sorrowful tales, ranging from resoundingly sympathetic tales dealing with the loss of life and defeat. The piece titled " which depicts Taira no Atsumori and Kumagai Naozane at the Battle of Ichi-no-Tani is especially popular for these reasons.

Kōwakamaru was born in Nyū district, Echizen Province. After his father's death he entered Mt. Hiei (probably Enryaku-ji temple).
In Kyoto, his talents in music and dance became renowned,  and eventually initiated the Kōwaka style.

Several accounts describe how Kōwakamaru developed the new art form. Or, while in Kyoto he was taught Heike in melodies similar to the Kōwaka, then devised tunes different from his master. Or that the art blossomed when he adapted the sōshi narrative "Yashima-gun" and set it to music, to great acclaim.

Echizen Kōwaka troupe
Thus Momonoi Naoaki (Kōwakamaru) founded the Kōwaka troupe, and afterwards styled his clan's name as the "Kōwaka family". The family had three branches: the Hachirokurō, Yajirō, and Kohachirō, named after the founder's sons and son-in-law, and were based in Nyū district of Echizen Province, thus they have been called the "".

Kōwakamai reached its peak during the 16th century when the actors received small fiefdoms from warlords Oda Nobunaga, Toyotomi Hideyoshi and the like. When Tokugawa Ieyasu founded the shogunate, the clan received 300 koku of rice as stipend, and the three families took turns serving in rotation.

Daigashira School
In Tenshō 10 (1582 CE) Yukitsugu was invited to Kyūshū by the lord of Chikugo Province's Yamashita Castle, and his cousin, the lord of Yanagawa Castle,  where he taught the performance style and transmitted the art form to the lords and their vassals. That style of kōwakamai became Ōe kōwakamai.

Decline
In the early parts of the Edo period, kōwakamai performances were given annually at the court of the shogunate. But the art had gone into obscurity by the Genroku era (1688–1704), and had fallen into complete oblivion by the Meiji period in the 19th century.

The Daigashira School Ōe kōwakamai has been transmitted to the present day, surviving in the Ōe district of Miyama, Fukuoka. (See §Restoring the kōwakamai art below).

Kōwakamai corpus
Many kōwakamai pieces represent variations of tales found in other texts and genres.  However, the kōwakamai versions contain variations such as shortening or extending the dramatic prose of given scenes within an episode.

Kōwakamai originally had  thirty-six numbers in the standard repertoire. Anecdotally, there were thirty-six otogi-zōshi storybooks at the imperial court that the founder set to music. But according to one genealogical document, a larger number of pieces were culled to a canon of thirty-six pieces during the time of Kohachirō. The standard thirty-six texts were also later wood-block printed in storybooks called .

There were outside-the-canon pieces added, raising the total to forty-two pieces.  Some fifty total texts survive today.

For argument's sake kōwakamai fall into the following categories: Ancient tales, Minamoto tales, Heike tales, Yoshitsune tales, Soga tales, and miscellaneous tales.

Ancient tales:

Minamoto tales:

Heike tales:

Yoshitsune tales:

Soga tales:

Miscellaneous

Description of the art
Evidentiary documentation is too sparse to provide any detail on how kōwakamai was performed in its inception or during its heyday in the late 16th to the early 17th centuries. In the early period, kōwakamai was not starkly distinguishable from the kusemai: both involved two players and both were apparently interchangeably called ", or  simply ".

The surviving kōwakamai (the form transmitted in the Ōe region) involves three players, the principal tayū and two supporting actors named waki, and shite. The principal and the supporters were dressed alike, a  top, long version of the hakama trouser, and no mask, but they wore different types of  hats.

The kōwakamai performers do not impersonate characters, and do not "act", they merely narrate the lines spoken by the personae dramatis. Also there are no choreographic movements involved that can be recognized as "dance" in the usual European sense.

Kusemai influence
Kōwakamai is often assumed to have developed from the kusemai, although some commentators do not think this is firmly established. One basis of making the connection are the records stating kusemai being performed by a certain "Kōwaka-tayū" of Tanaka Village in Echizen Providence. This plausibly referred to Kōwakamaru or one of his immediate successors, so the dance must have been the same thing as kōwakamai, or, a "transitional" form approaching it. Scholars say this is kusemai performed by men is of a "different order" from the dance which is otherwise known as kusemai, namely, the courtesan dance as described by Zeami, or a dance show primarily featuring physically attractive women and boys.

Restoring the kōwakamai art 
The folk custom is practiced in the town Setakamachi Ōe in Miyama City, Fukuoka Prefecture.

Although almost nothing is truly known about how kōwakamai was performed at the time of its greatest popularity, performances are held annually in Japan as part of a local festival of sorts.  The instrumental melodic arrangements of eight ballads as well as the method of their oral recitation have been restored by the Kōwakamai Preservation Society in Setakamachi Ōe, Miyama City in Fukuoka Prefecture.  On 20 January 2008 "Atsumori", "Takadachi", and "Yōchi Soga" were performed by the Kōwakamai Preservation Society's adult troupe.  "Atsumori" was performed by the young adult troupe.  And "Hamaide" and "Nihongi" were performed by the elementary school-age troupe.  The tale "Atsumori" is particularly well known because of its depiction of Oda Nobunaga.  Before Oda departs for the Battle of Okehazama, he does a choreographed dance and recites the famous lines, "Although a man may be alive on earth for fifty years, in heaven those fifty years are but an instant—a dream."  This performance of "Atsumori" was also performed in Kyoto by the Kōwakamai Society in February 2009.

At the same time as the Kyoto "Atsumori" performance, "Ataka" was also staged.  Both performances were recorded on CD & DVD by the Kyoto City University of the Arts' Research Centre for Japanese Traditional Music.

Explanatory notes

References 
Citations

Bibliography

  
  
 
 
   
   
; originally published as Fujita (1929), "Kōwakamai no ryūso to kyokumoku ni tsuite" , Kokugo to Kokubungaku 9, pp. 28–53 

 
Muromachi period